The Amelung House and Glassworks is a historic home located at Urbana, Frederick County, Maryland, United States. It is a two-story, late-Georgian brick home on a stone foundation built about 1785.  The property once had the New Bremen glassworks built by Johann Friedrich Amelung after he came to Maryland in 1784; no above-ground remains of the factory remain. Fine examples of New Bremen glass work may be seen at the Metropolitan Museum of Art in New York City; the Corning Museum of Glass in Corning, New York; and Winterthur Museum in Winterthur, Delaware.

The Amelung House and Glassworks was listed on the National Register of Historic Places in 1973.

References

External links
, including photo from 1968, at Maryland Historical Trust

The Amelung Excavation Papers, 1962-1975 are held at the Rakow Research Library of the Corning Museum of Glass. (Retrieved 23 October 2015)

Houses in Frederick County, Maryland
Houses on the National Register of Historic Places in Maryland
Houses completed in 1785
Georgian architecture in Maryland
Historic American Buildings Survey in Maryland
National Register of Historic Places in Frederick County, Maryland